Colgate-Palmolive Pakistan, formerly known as National Detergents Limited, is a Pakistani consumer goods company which is a subsidiary of American multinational company Colgate-Palmolive and Pakistani company Lakson Group with 40% shares. It was founded in 1977 and is based in Karachi, Pakistan.

It operates in oral care, personal care, and fabric care sectors.

History
It was founded in 1977 as National Detergents Limited.

In 2019, the Competition Commission of Pakistan imposed  on the company for running deceptive marketing campaign.

In May 2019, Lakson Group divested 21 percent shares to parent company Colgate-Palmolive.

Factories
 Karachi
 Kotri

Brands
 Colgate
 Colgate Toothbrush
 Palmolive
 Brite
 Bonus
 Softlan
 Express
 Lemon Max

References

Colgate-Palmolive
Companies based in Karachi
Pakistani subsidiaries of foreign companies
Lakson Group
Manufacturing companies established in 1977
Companies listed on the Pakistan Stock Exchange
Pakistani companies established in 1977